James Barnston (July 3, 1831 – May 20, 1858), a son of HBC fur trader George Barnston, was born at Norway House (Man.), and trained as a physician at the University of Edinburgh. He obtained an M.D. presenting a thesis Observations on scarlatina.

Barnston had a love of natural history from his father's influence and this was nurtured while studying medicine. He returned to Canada in 1853 and practiced medicine in Montreal where he also actively continued his botanical pursuits. He promoted the founding of a chair in natural history at McGill University and became the first professor of botany at that institution.

He became ill at the end of his first course of lectures and never recovered, dying in his 26th year.

References

External links
 

1831 births
1858 deaths
19th-century Canadian physicians
People from Northern Region, Manitoba